Little Lights is an album by British folk musician Kate Rusby, released in 2001.

Track listing
All songs by Kate Rusby unless otherwise stated.

"Playing of Ball" (Words trad., music Rusby) – 3:31  
"I Courted a Sailor" – 3:58 
"Withered and Died" (Richard Thompson) – 3:58 
"Merry Green Broom" (Words trad./Rusby, music Rusby) – 3:22 
"Let the Cold Wind Blow" – 5:18 
"Canaan's Land" (Trad. arranged by Rusby/John McCusker) – 3:50 
"Some Tyrant" (Trad. arranged by Rusby/McCusker) – 5:09 
"William and Davy" – 4:03 
"Who Will Sing Me Lullabies?" – 5:20 
"Matt Hyland" (Words trad., music Kate Rusby) – 4:59 
"My Young Man" – 4:05
"The Big Ship Sails" (Trad. arranged by Rusby/McCusker) (hidden track) – 2:11

Personnel
 Kate Rusby – vocals, guitar
 Ian Carr – guitar
 John Doyle – guitar
 Darrell Scott – guitar, vocals
 Ewen Vernal – double bass
 Andy Seward – double bass
 Danny Thompson – double bass
 Andy Cutting – diatonic accordion
 Mairtin O'Connor – accordion
 Michael McGoldrick – flute, whistle
 John McCusker – fiddle, cittern, whistle
 Malcolm Stitt – bouzouki
 Tim O'Brien – mandolin, vocals
 Alison Brown – banjo
 Keith Angel – percussion, marimba
 Eddi Reader – vocals
 John Jones – vocals
 Alan Morrison – cornet
 Richard Marshall – cornet
 Sandy Smith – horn
 Nick Hudson – trombone
 Shaun Crowther – tuba

References

Kate Rusby albums
2001 albums